Emil Iliev Koshlukov (born 26 October 1965) is a Bulgarian journalist, media manager and former politician.

Life 
Born in Pazardzhik, Koshlukov graduated from the English language high school in Plovdiv in 1985 and subsequently studied English philology at Sofia University. Between 1991 and 1996, he was also enrolled as a political science student at the University of California in Santa Barbara.

In 1989, he was one of the leading figures behind the formation of the first independent student organizations in communist Bulgaria and participated in civil disobedience campaigns against the government. After being affiliated with the UDF in the early 1990s, in 2001 Koshlukov was elected to the National Parliament for the first time as part of NDSV. In 2004, he founded the New Age (Bulgarian: Новото Време) political party and became its chairman. The new party was not able to find representation in the National Parliament following the 2005 elections.

In 2009, Koshlukov participated for 25 consecutive days in the third season of reality show VIP Brother on the Bulgarian commercial TV channel Nova. He was the only politician among a total of 25 celebrity participants.

In early 2018, Koshlukov was appointed programme director of BNT1, the main channel of public service broadcaster Bulgarian National Television (BNT). At the same time, he continued to host the daily political talk show More from the Day.

In 2019, the Bulgarian Council for Electronic Media appointed Koshlukov interim Director General of BNT.

References 

1965 births
Living people
National Movement for Stability and Progress politicians
Bulgarian journalists
People from Pazardzhik
Sofia University alumni